Trichoplusia circumscripta is a moth of the family Noctuidae. It is found in the eastern part of the Mediterranean Basin and parts of the Near East and the Middle East. It has been recorded in all the Levant countries. The species is invasive in Egypt.

Adults are on wing year round. There is probably one generation per year.

References

External links
Fauna Europaea
Lepiforum.de

Plusiinae
Moths of Europe
Moths of Asia
Moths of the Middle East
Taxa named by Christian Friedrich Freyer